The 151st Theater Information Operations Group, or 151st TIOG, is an Information Operations formation of the United States Army, headquartered at Fort Totten, New York. Founded in 2009, the 151st TIOG is the only Theater Information Operations Group in the U.S. Army Reserve. It is composed mostly of Army Reserve Soldiers in two battalions based out of Parks Reserve Forces Training Area (Camp Parks), Fort George G. Meade, and Fort Totten. The current commander is Colonel Marlene Markotan, who assumed command in July 2019.

Historically, 151st TIOG was a major subordinate command under the 76th Operational Response Command (76th ORC). In October 2015, the 151st TIOG was realigned to the U.S. Army Civil Affairs and Psychological Operations Command (Airborne) (USACAPOC(A)). The 151st TIOG gained the 303rd Information Operations Battalion and deactivated the 302nd Information Operations Battalion after the 152nd TIOG was deactivated in late 2015.

Regionally aligned and globally engaged, the 151st TIOG is the U.S. Army Reserve Information Operations force provider to primarily USEUCOM, USAFRICOM, USCENTCOM, USSOUTHCOM, and United States Cyber Command. Since the establishment of the TIOGs in 2009, the demand signal for IO support to theater activities and operations has increased drastically. The command's soldiers bring civilian expertise, education, and qualifications not found among regular active duty soldiers.  The projects they coordinate are the subject of many of the "Good News" stories run in the media each day across Africa, Europe, Middle East, and various other locations.

Information Operations
Information Operations (United States) is a category of direct and indirect support operations for the United States Military.  By definition in Joint Publication 3-13, "IO are described as the integrated employment of electronic warfare (EW), computer network operations (CNO), psychological operations (PSYOP), military deception (MILDEC), and operations security (OPSEC), in concert with specified supporting and related capabilities, to influence, disrupt, corrupt or usurp adversarial human and automated decision making while protecting our own."  Information Operations (IO) are actions taken to affect adversary information and information systems while defending one's own information and information systems.

Subordinate units
The 151st TIOG primary mission is on order, to deploy modular and tailorable Information Operations forces worldwide in order to gain and maintain information dominance by conducting Information Warfare operations in the Information Environment." Information Operations (IO) are actions taken to affect adversary information and information systems while defending one's own information and information systems.

Information Operations units are the field commander's capability to synchronize and de-conflict information related capabilities (IRC) in the commander's information environment. The soldiers make up teams which interface and provide Information Operations expertise to the staff. 151st TIOG Information Operations soldiers are particularly suited for this mission since they are Army Reserve soldiers with civilian occupations such as law enforcement, engineering, medicine, law, banking, public administration, etc; and, civilian education and qualifications such as Project Management Professional (PMP), Doctor of Philosophy (PhD), Juris Doctor (J.D), Master of Business Administration (MBA), Master of Public Administration (MPA), etc.

Information Operations soldiers have been integral to U.S. missions across North West Africa, East Africa, Europe, Middle East, and various other locations.

See also
 Information Operations (United States)
 U.S. Army Civil Affairs and Psychological Operations Command (Airborne)
 United States Army Reserve
 Electronic Warfare
 Computer network operations
 Psychological Operations
 Civil Affairs
 Civil-military operations
 Military Deception 
 Disinformation
 Misinformation
 Operations security
 Cyberwarfare
 Network-centric warfare
 Communications Security
 Command and control warfare
 Political Warfare
 Psychological Warfare
 Public affairs (military)
 Irregular Warfare
 iWar
 Information Operations Roadmap

References

External links
 U.S. Army Civil Affairs & Psychological Operations Command (Airborne), U.S. Army Reserve Official Website

Information operations and warfare
Groups of the United States Army
Civil affairs units and formations of the United States Army
Military units and formations established in 1990